Fateh Muhammad or Nadim Sahib  (b. 6 May 1684 – 9 September 1729 d.) was a general of Mysore and the father of Hyder Ali, his fifth child from his third wife, and the Grandfather of Tipu Sultan.

He was born on 6 May 1684 CE at Doddallapur in the Era of Moghul empire and the reign of Padishah Aurangzeb, He died at the age of 45 years 4 months 3 days when he was fighting in a battle between the Subedar of Sira and Jaher Khan of Chittor Subah, Fath Muhammad was killed on 9 September 1729 A.D. He was buried at Kolar alongside his parents.

At an early age, he served as a commander of 50 men in the Rocket artillery of the army of the Nawab of Carnatic. It is believed that he served alongside Zulfiqar Ali Khan, the first Nawab of the Carnatic during the Siege of Jinji. This was maintained under the command of the Mughal Emperor Aurangzeb with the purpose of capturing or killing the renegade Maratha ruler Rajaram. then later in 1700's he becoming valuable Military Commander. Fath Muhammad eventually entered the service of the Wodeyar Rajas of the Kingdom of Mysore, where he rose to become a powerful military commander. The Wodeyars awarded him Budikote as a jagir (land grant), where he then served as Naik (Lord).
Mughal nobility
Mughal Empire people
Mughal generals
1684 births
1729 deaths

See also
Nawab of the Carnatic
Zulfiqar Ali Khan
Mughal Empire
Siege of Jinji
Hyder Ali Dynasty

References

1704 births
1725 deaths
Indian generals
People of the Kingdom of Mysore
18th-century Indian people
People from Kolar
Military personnel from Karnataka